Larabee is an unincorporated community in Lafayette Parish, Louisiana, United States.

The community is located near the intersection of Teurlings Drive and East Willow Street.

References

Unincorporated communities in Louisiana
Unincorporated communities in Lafayette Parish, Louisiana
Acadiana